Giovanni Ferrero (born 21 September 1964) is an Italian businessman and writer. He assumed the leadership of the confectionery company Ferrero SpA after the death of his brother Pietro Ferrero in 2011. As of October 2022, he has an estimated net worth of $37.6 billion making him the 28th richest in the world, and richest person in Italy.

Early life 
He was born in Farigliano, Italy, the son of Maria Franca Fissolo and Michele Ferrero, the owner of the multinational confectionery corporation Ferrero. In 1975, he moved to Brussels, Belgium, where he studied at the European Schools. Then he moved to the US, where he studied marketing at Lebanon Valley College.

Career
On completing his studies, he returned to Europe to work in the family company. In 1997 he became joint CEO of Ferrero together with his brother Pietro.

In April 2011, after the death of his brother in a bicycling accident in South Africa, he became the sole CEO of Ferrero Group. His father, Michele Ferrero, remained as executive chairman.

Michele Ferrero died in 2015, leaving the company solely in Giovanni's hands.

American business magazine Forbes reported that Giovanni Ferrero then took over the role of executive chairman in 2015, and held both the titles of CEO and executive chairman for two years until he hired Lapo Civiletti to take over the company's CEO position in 2017.

Publications
 "Marketing progetto 2000. La gestione della complessità", 1990
 "Stelle di tenebra", Mondadori 1999
 "Campo Paradiso", Rizzoli 2007
 "Il canto delle farfalle", Rizzoli 2010

Personal life
Ferrero is married to Paola Rossi. They have two sons.

References

 

1964 births
Giovanni
Italian billionaires
Italian businesspeople
Living people
People from Farigliano

Alumni of the European Schools